The Skeleton Tank also known as the Spider Tank was an experimental prototype tank built in 1918 by the Pioneer Tractor Company, Winona, Minnesota for $15,000 ($  in ). The prototype was ready for trials by October 1918. Designed with several innovative features, some of which were controversial at the time, the Skeleton Tank project did not proceed beyond the single prototype.

Design
The objective of this prototype was to develop a lightweight vehicle capable of crossing wide trenches in a manner similar to the then-conventional heavy British tanks.  Unlike the British tanks with their fully enclosed chassis, the Skeleton Tank achieved the requisite lozenge shape by supporting its tracks with a skeleton-like framework formed from ordinary iron pipes joined by standard plumbing connections.  Suspended between these track frames was an armored fighting compartment carrying a machine gun turret. The engines were also housed in this armor-protected box.

This arrangement dramatically reduced the weight of the vehicle as compared to the larger British and French tanks while preserving the trench-crossing capabilities of those machines, and there was a belief that most enemy bullets and cannon rounds would pass harmlessly through the structure.  However, it eliminated the possibility of mounting weapons in sponsons as in the British tanks and thus limited the armament that could be carried.

Motive power consisted of two Beaver  four-cylinder engines with a final drive joining to a gearbox suspended between the rear horns of the tracks.

Specifications

The crew of two consisted of the driver and the commander/gunner who manned the .30 (7.62 mm) caliber machine gun in the turret.

It was never ordered into production.

Survivor
The cosmetically restored Skeleton Tank is preserved under a canopy at the United States Army Ordnance Museum at Aberdeen Proving Ground, Maryland.

Bibliography

Notes

References 

 - Total pages: 240 
 - Total pages: 48 

World War I tanks of the United States
World War I tanks
Abandoned military projects of the United States
History of the tank
Trial and research tanks of the United States